Chaetostomella baezi is a species of tephritid or fruit flies in the genus Chaetostomella of the family Tephritidae.

Distribution
Canary Islands.

References

Tephritinae
Insects described in 2000
Diptera of Europe